In enzymology, a scyllo-inosamine-4-phosphate amidinotransferase is an enzyme that catalyzes the chemical reaction

L-arginine + 1-amino-1-deoxy-scyllo-inositol 4-phosphate  L-ornithine + 1-guanidino-1-deoxy-scyllo-inositol 4-phosphate

Thus, the two substrates of this enzyme are L-arginine and 1-amino-1-deoxy-scyllo-inositol 4-phosphate, whereas its two products are L-ornithine and 1-guanidino-1-deoxy-scyllo-inositol 4-phosphate.

This enzyme belongs to the family of transferases that transfer one-carbon groups, specifically the amidinotransferases.  The systematic name of this enzyme class is L-arginine:1-amino-1-deoxy-scyllo-inositol-4-phosphate amidinotransferase. Other names in common use include L-arginine:inosamine-P-amidinotransferase, inosamine-P amidinotransferase, L-arginine:inosamine phosphate amidinotransferase, and inosamine-phosphate amidinotransferase.  This enzyme participates in streptomycin biosynthesis.

Structural studies

As of late 2007, only one structure has been solved for this class of enzymes, with the PDB accession code .

References

 

EC 2.1.4
Enzymes of known structure